Major Pierson was launched in American in 1774 under another name and first appeared in Lloyd's Register (LR) in the supplemental pages for 1781. An American privateer captured her in 1781 and she became the Pennsylvania letter of marque Admiral Zoutman. The British Royal Navy recaptured her in 1782.

Lloyd's List (LL) reported on 18 December 1781 that Major Pearson, Withall, master, while on a voyage from London to New York, had parted from her convoy in the Western Isles in a gale. She was taken and her captor sent her into Egg Harbour. Her entry in Lloyd's Register for 1782 bears the annotation "taken".

Major Pierson was offered for public sale on 25 October 1781 at Little Egg Harbor with her sails and rigging, and her cargo of flour, barley, and hops. 

Major Pearson became the Pennsylvania letter of marque Admiral Zoutman, commissioned on 14 January 1782 under the command of Captain William McFadden.  

The frigate  captured Admiral Zoutman on 12 March 1782. When captured Admiral Zoutman was carrying 1500 barrels of flour. Garland sent her into New York.

Citations and references
Citations

References
 

1774 ships
Age of Sail merchant ships of England
Captured ships
Age of Sail merchant ships of the United States